Güngören is a Turkish word and may refer to:

Places
 Güngören, a district of Istanbul Province, Turkey
 Güngören, Anamur, a village in Anamur district of Mersin Province, Turkey (former Teniste)
 Güngören, Arhavi, a village in Arhavi disytict of Artvin Province, Turkey
 Güngören, İliç
 Güngören, Midyat, a village in Midyat district of Mardin Province, Turkey
 Güngören, Nilüfer, a village in Nilüfer district of Bursa Province, Turkey

Other uses
 Güngören M.Yahya Baş Stadium, a multi-purpose stadium in  Güngören district of Istanbul, Turkey
 İstanbul Güngörenspor, a sports club located in Güngören, İstanbul, Turkey (formerly known as Güngören Belediyespor)